The Monguor language (also written Mongour and Mongor) is a Mongolic language of its Shirongolic branch and is part of the Gansu–Qinghai sprachbund (also called the Amdo sprachbund). There are several dialects, mostly spoken by the Monguor people. A written script was devised for Huzhu Monguor (Mongghul) in the late 20th century but has been little used.

A division into two languages, namely Mongghul in Huzhu Tu Autonomous County and Mangghuer in Minhe Hui and Tu Autonomous County, is considered necessary by some linguists. While Mongghul was under strong influence from Amdo Tibetan, the same holds for Mangghuer and Sinitic languages, and local varieties of Chinese such as the Gangou language were in turn influenced by Monguor.

Phonology

Vowels 

 Vowel sounds may also be nasalized when preceding a nasal consonant, in different environments.
Vowels  may also undergo a devoicing process in certain phonetic environments.

Consonants 

 can be heard as a voiced fricative  within the onset of a stressed syllable, or of a word-initial syllable. It can also be heard as a flap sound  intervocalically in the onset of an unstressed syllable. In a syllable-coda position, it is heard as a rhotic  vowel sound.
 can have a spirantized allophone of  strongly in stressed syllables.

Numerals

Mongolian numerals such as the following are only in use in the Mongghul dialect, while Mangghuer speakers have switched to counting in Chinese. Note that while the Mongolian script has only arban for 'ten', Middle Mongolian *harpa/n including *h can be reconstructed from the scripts.

Notes

References 
Dpal-ldan-bkra-shis, Keith Slater, et al. (1996): Language Materials of China’s Monguor Minority: Huzhu Mongghul and Minhe Mangghuer. Sino-Platonic papers no. 69.
Georg, Stefan (2003): Mongghul. In: Janhunen, Juha (ed.) (2003): The Mongolic languages. London: Routledge: 286-306.
Slater, Keith W. (2003): A grammar of Mangghuer: A Mongolic language of China's Qinghai-Gansu sprachbund. London/New York: RoutledgeCurzon.
 Svantesson, Jan-Olof, Anna Tsendina, Anastasia Karlsson, Vivan Franzén (2005): The Phonology of Mongolian. New York: Oxford University Press.
Zhàonàsītú 照那斯图 (1981): Tǔzúyǔ jiǎnzhì 土族语简志 (Introduction to the Tu language). Běijīng 北京: Mínzú chūbǎnshè 民族出版社.

External links
[The Tu ethnic minority http://www.china.org.cn/e-groups/shaoshu/shao-2-tu.htm]
ELAR archive of Mongghul language documentation materials

Agglutinative languages
Southern Mongolic languages
Languages of China
L
Mongolic languages